This article provides information on candidates who stood for the 2017 Queensland state election. The election was held on 25 November 2017.

At the close of nominations on 8 November 2017, there were 453 candidates standing for the election. The ALP, LNP & The Greens parties nominated candidates for every seat, therefore nominating 93 candidates each. One Nation nominated 61 candidates, KAP nominated 10 and CR nominated 8, whilst Independent or non-registered party candidates stood at 95.

Retiring Members

Labor
Bill Byrne (Rockhampton) – announced 7 October 2017

Liberal National
Verity Barton (Broadwater) – lost preselection 28 May 2017; did not re-nominate
Ian Rickuss (Lockyer) – announced 12 November 2016
Jeff Seeney (Callide) – announced 2 March 2017
Lawrence Springborg (Southern Downs) – announced 3 December 2016

Independent
Billy Gordon (Cook) – elected as Labor; announced 31 October 2017
Peter Wellington (Nicklin) – announced 16 February 2017

Legislative Assembly
Sitting members are shown in bold text. Successful candidates are highlighted in the relevant colour. Where there is possible confusion, an asterisk (*) is also used.

Unregistered parties and groups
The Animal Justice Party endorsed Lisa Foo in Ferny Grove, Danielle Cox in Logan, Janelle Clancy in Macalister, Ric Allport in Mermaid Beach, Rachel Radic in Nicklin, Jamila Riley in Ninderry and Karagh-Mae Kelly in South Brisbane.
The Australian Workers Party endorsed Sue Mureau in Glass House, and Greg Bradley in Macalister.
The Whig Party endorsed Mike Jessop in Kawana.
The North Queensland Party endorsed Peter Raffles in Hinchinbrook.
People Decide endorsed Angus Jell in Bulimba, Anita Diamond in Maiwar and Karel Boele in South Brisbane.
The Reason Party endorsed Robin Bristow in Noosa.
The Socialist Alliance endorsed Kamala Emanuel in McConnel.

References
LNP - Meet Our Team
Queensland Greens
Pauline Hanson's One Nation

Candidates for Queensland state elections